This is a list of 698 species in the genus Eucosma.

Eucosma species

References